Iowa Highway 44 (Iowa 44) is an east–west highway in the central and west-central portions of the state.  It runs parallel to Interstate 80, which runs  to the south for most of Iowa 44's route.  Iowa 44 begins at its junction with U.S. Highway 30 four miles (6 km) northeast of Logan.  It ends at an interchange with the Iowa Highway 141 freeway at Grimes.  Iowa 44 was created in 1969 when Iowa Highway 64 was shortened to its current route in eastern Iowa.  Most of the route is a part of the Western Skies Scenic Byway.

Route description

Iowa Highway 44 begins between Logan and Woodbine on U.S. Highway 30.  It goes east to Portsmouth, where it intersects Iowa Highway 191, then continues east to Harlan, where it intersects U.S. Highway 59.  It continues east from Harlan and intersects Iowa Highway 173 at Kimballton and U.S. Highway 71 at Hamlin.  It then continues to Guthrie Center, where it intersects Iowa Highway 25 and Panora, where it intersects Iowa Highway 4.  It then intersects U.S. Highway 169 three miles (5 km) before entering Dallas Center  and ends at a freeway interchange with Iowa Highway 141 in Grimes in the Des Moines metropolitan area.

History
Iowa 44 was created on January 1, 1969, when the Iowa State Highway Commission reorganized the state's primary highway system.  Iowa 44 was one of 26 state highways to receive a new route number.  Prior to 1969, what is now Iowa 44 was part of two highways, Iowa 64 and Iowa 39.  Since its designation, the route has undergone few changes.

The westernmost  of Iowa 44 are part of the state's Western Skies Scenic Byway.

Major intersections

References

044
Transportation in Harrison County, Iowa
Transportation in Shelby County, Iowa
Transportation in Audubon County, Iowa
Transportation in Guthrie County, Iowa
Transportation in Dallas County, Iowa
Transportation in Polk County, Iowa